Amos Poe is an American New York City-based director and screenwriter, described by The New York Times as a "pioneering indie filmmaker."

Career
Amos Poe is one of the first punk filmmakers and his film The Blank Generation (1976)—co-directed with Ivan Král— is one of the earliest punk films. The film features performances by Richard Hell, Talking Heads, Television, Patti Smith, and Wayne County. Rolling Stone named it number 6 on its list of 25 Greatest Punk Rock Movies of All Time.

He is also associated with the birth of No Wave Cinema due to films such as The Foreigner (1978), featuring Eric Mitchell, Debbie Harry, Anya Phillips; and Subway Riders (1981), starring Susan Tyrrell, Robbie Coltrane, and Cookie Mueller. During this time he was also the director of the Public-access television cable TV show TV Party hosted by Glenn O'Brien and Chris Stein.

He is part of the Remodernist film movement, which he described as the next development of Postmodernism and the transformation of existing cultural features, but "using the technology and the sensibility of contemporary rather than nostalgia". "My idea of my work's importance is to see how it moves the culture to where I'd like to see it," Poe said in a 1981 interview.

In 2008, he wrote the screenplay for the 2008 Amy Redford film The Guitar.

The New York Times reported in 2020 that Poe had lost all ownership of several of his groundbreaking films, including The Blank Generation, to Ivan Kral in a 2012 lawsuit over profits from licensing fees for showings of the film. Thereafter, Kral billed himself as the director of the film, demoting Poe to co-editor; Kral also acquired ownership, for $10 each, of Poe's films Unmade Beds, The Foreigner, Subway Riders, and Empire II. In late 2019, shortly before Kral's death, at a screening of The Blank Generation, it was revealed that Kral, or his wife, Cindy Hudson, had changed the ending of the film, switching out the original ending (depicting Patti Smith Group guitarist Lenny Kaye), for a brief biopic about Kral, followed with the credit "directed by Cindy Hudson." Although the theater screening the film had, apparently unknowingly, marketed it as the iconic 1976 work, it was a considerably different film, and Poe's name was excised entirely.

Partial filmography
Night Lunch (1975)
The Blank Generation (1976)
Unmade Beds (1976)
The Foreigner (1978)
TV Party (1978)
Subway Riders (1981)
Alphabet City (1985)
Rocket Gibraltar (1988) (screenplay)
Triple Bogey on a Par Five Hole (1991)
Joey Breaker (1992) (producer)
Dead Weekend (1994) 
Frogs for Snakes (1998)
29 Palms (2001) (murchian engineering)
Steve Earle: Just An American Boy (2003)
When You Find Me (2004)
John The Cop (2004)
Her Illness (2004)
The Guitar (2007) (screenplay, producer)
Empire II (2007)
La Commedia di Amos Poe (2010)
Ladies & Gentlemen (2012)
A Walk in the Park (2012)
Happiness Is a Warm Gun (2015)

References

External links
 Official website for Amos Poe
 
 Guide to the Amos Poe Papers at NYU's Fales Library
 1981 interview with Poe by Sarah Charlesworth for BOMB Magazine

Punk filmmakers
Film directors from New York City
Living people
1949 births